Valerio Amoroso (born 26 September 1980) is an Italian professional basketball player who plays as power forward or center.

References

External links
 Statistiche Nazionale 

1980 births
Living people
Centers (basketball)
Italian men's basketball players
Pallacanestro Varese players
Power forwards (basketball)